Cartin is the surname of:

 Carlos Durán Cartín (1852–1924), Vice President and acting President of Costa Rica and a doctor
 Paul Cartin (born 1981), Irish Gaelic footballer

See also
 Cartan (disambiguation)
 Carton (surname)
 McCartan, a surname of Irish origin believed to be the forefather of Cartin